The 2009 International GT Open season was the fourth season of the International GT Open. The season began on April 18 and ended on November 8, 2009. Joël Camathias and Marcel Fässler claimed both the Super GT title and the overall title, beating Autorlando Sport's Richard Lietz and Gianluca Roda in both standings. GTS champions were the Kessel Racing pairing of Michał Broniszewski and Philipp Peter.

Drivers and Teams

 All cars run on Dunlop tyres.

Calendar

 Replaces the round originally meant to be held at Valencia Street Circuit. Held simultaneously with the Spanish GT Championship races.

Championships
Points are awarded to the top five finishers in the order 10-8-6-4-3.

Drivers Championship

Super GT Standings

GTS Standings

Teams Championship

Super GT Standings

GTS Standings

References

External links
Official website

International GT Open
International GT Open seasons